Zhong Kui the Demon Queller with Five Bats is a popular Chinese painting featuring the Chinese mythological spirit Zhong Kui. It originates from the Ming dynasty (1368–1644). A possible painter for this artwork is Wu Wei. The painting is held in the Ashmolean Museum in England.

Description 
The picture features Zhong Kui, accompanied by two of his demon followers. The demons are holding a vase and Zhong Kui holds a scepter while looking up at five bats flying in the sky. In Chinese symbolism, the five bats represent five blessings: health, longevity, virtue, wealth, and a graceful death. In the background is a forested mountain surrounded by a heavy mist.

Bats in culture
Paintings in the collection of the Ashmolean Museum
Chinese paintings
Mammals in art